is a former Japanese football player and manager.

Playing career
Sekizuka was born in Funabashi on October 26, 1960. After graduating from Waseda University, he joined Honda in 1984. In 1984 season, he was selected Rookie of the Year awards and Best Eleven. He played 112 games and scored 36 goals in Japan Soccer League. In 1991, he retired.

Coaching career
After retirement, in 1993, Sekizuka became assistant coach for Kashima Antlers under manager Masakatsu Miyamoto. In 1995, he moved to Shimizu S-Pulse with Miyamoto. In 1996, he returned Kashima Antlers and coached until 2003. In July 1998 and August 1999, he also managed the club as caretaker manager. In 2004, he moved to J2 League club Kawasaki Frontale and became manager. In first season, he led the club to the champions and the club was promoted J1 League. In April 2008, he resigned for health reasons. In 2009, he returned the club as manager, but he resigned end of season. In September 2010, he became manager for Japan U-23 national team for 2012 Summer Olympics and assistant coach for Japan national team. At 2012 Summer Olympics, he led Japan to the 4th place. From 2013, he managed Júbilo Iwata (2013) and JEF United Chiba (2014-2016).

Managerial statistics

Awards
 Japan Soccer League Rookie of the Year: 1984
 Japan Soccer League Best Eleven: 1984

References

External links

1960 births
Living people
Waseda University alumni
Association football people from Chiba Prefecture
People from Funabashi
Japanese footballers
Japan Soccer League players
Honda FC players
Japanese football managers
J1 League managers
J2 League managers
Kashima Antlers managers
Kawasaki Frontale managers
Júbilo Iwata managers
JEF United Chiba managers
Association football forwards